Schladen is a former Samtgemeinde ("collective municipality") in the district of Wolfenbüttel, in Lower Saxony, Germany. Its seat was in the village Schladen. It was disbanded on 1 November 2013, when the municipality Schladen-Werla was formed.

The Samtgemeinde Schladen consisted of the following municipalities:

 Gielde 
 Hornburg 
 Schladen
 Werlaburgdorf 

Former Samtgemeinden in Lower Saxony